The Didgori-1 is a Georgian-made armoured personnel carrier developed by the "Delta" research center of the Ministry of Defence and part of the Didgori-series APC family currently constructed in five baseline variants.

Technical characteristics
The vehicle is assembled on and around the chassis of US Ford Super Duty pickup trucks. It is equipped with FLIR Systems thermal and night vision imaging devices provided for front and rear view. Information from the cameras is displayed on monitors for the driver, the commander and the passenger section. The system is interlinked with a special navigation system GPS.

Armor
The armour withstands impacts of 7.62×54mmR AP rounds and 6–8 kg mine blasts at direct contact and from underneath without heavy damage. Further details are unknown, since the composition of the material is classified. The two baseline models are armed with a 7.62×51mm M134 Minigun and the 12.7×108mm NSV machine gun, but can be armed with a wide range of armaments, including ATGMs.

The monocoque steel v-hull provides protection against small arms fire, artillery shell shrapnel, anti-personnel/tank mines and IEDs. Front wheel arches are designed to be blown away to free blast pockets.

Operators

  – in service of the Defense Forces of Georgia.

Gallery

See also
 Didgori-2
 Otokar Cobra
 HMMWV
 Oshkosh L-ATV
 Lazika

Sources

External links
 First Georgian Armored Personnel Carrier / APC - Didgori
 TAM of Georgia

Wheeled amphibious armoured fighting vehicles
Armoured cars
Wheeled armoured personnel carriers
Military equipment of Georgia (country)
Military vehicles introduced in the 2010s
Armoured personnel carriers of the post–Cold War period